The Aabach (also Aa, or Ustermer Aa for disambiguation with  the Mönchaltorfer Aa) is a minor river in the canton of Zürich, Switzerland. Its valley is known as 
Aatal ("Aa Valley"), eponymous of the settlement Aathal.

Gallery

References 

Rivers of Switzerland
Rivers of the canton of Zürich
1Aabach
Pfäffikersee